Jerry Bennett (or similar) may refer to:

People
Jerry Bennett (politician) (born 1943), Montana politician
Jerry Bennett, musician on Bulletproof Heart

Fictional characters
Geri Bennett, fictional female character in 2011 film, Abduction
Gerry Bennett, character in Night of the Lepus

See also
Gerard Bennett (disambiguation)